Arase is a village in Põhja-Pärnumaa Parish, Pärnu County in southwestern Estonia. It has a population of 43 (as of 1 January 2010).

References

Villages in Pärnu County